Prof. Michael Patrick Fogarty (3 October 1916 – 20 January 2001), was a British Liberal Party politician and academic.

Background
He was the son of Philip Christopher Fogarty, ICS, and Mary Belle Pye of Galway. He was educated at Ampleforth College and Christ Church, Oxford. In 1939 he married Phyllis Clark. They had two sons and two daughters.

Professional career
He was Professor of Industrial Relations, University College of Wales, Cardiff. He was Director, Institute for Family and Environmental Research, 1981–84.

Political career
His first venture into political activity was with the Labour Party. In 1938 he was adopted as Prospective Parliamentary Candidate for Tamworth. However, the expected 1939/40 General Election did not take place and come 1944 the constituency was abolished. He did not contest the 1945 General Election. He left the Labour Party and joined the Liberal Party. From 1964 to 1966 he was Vice-President of the Liberal Party. He was also Vice-President of the Association of University Teachers from 1964 to 1966. He was Liberal candidate for the Devizes division of Wiltshire at the 1964 Devizes by-election and again at the 1964 and 1966 General Elections. On each occasion he finished third. 
He was Liberal candidate for the Abingdon division at both the 1974 General Elections, both times finishing third. He did not stand for parliament again. In 1979 he stood as Liberal candidate for Thames Valley in the first European Parliament elections. He was elected a District Councillor in the Vale of White Horse, serving from 1973 to 1987. He was elected a County Councillor in Oxfordshire, serving from 1981 to 1989; he was Vice-Chairman 1985–86 and Chairman 1986–87.

Electoral contests

References

1916 births
2001 deaths
Liberal Party (UK) parliamentary candidates
People educated at Ampleforth College
Alumni of Christ Church, Oxford
British people of Irish descent